Saunders's gull (Chroicocephalus saundersi) or the Chinese black-headed gull, is a species of gull in the family Laridae.
It is found in China, Hong Kong, Japan, North Korea, South Korea, Macau, Russia, Taiwan, and Vietnam.
Its natural habitats are estuarine waters and intertidal marshes.
As with many other gulls, it has traditionally been placed in the genus Larus, but based on phylogenetic work some have moved it to Chroicocephalus, while others argue it is sufficiently distinct for placement in the monotypic Saundersilarus.
It is threatened by habitat loss. One of its few remaining strongholds are the Yancheng Coastal Wetlands, which hosts about 20% of the world's population.
The Saunders's gull is named after the British ornithologist Howard Saunders.

Description
This is a very small species of gull with a length of just  and, among gulls, only the little gull is smaller. Adults have a black hood and nape during the breeding season. It is very pale with a white body, pale grey wings and a narrow black tail band. The legs and short bill are black and the body is squat. Non-breeding birds have a mottled grey hood and nape, and white-tipped wings with black markings on the primaries.

Distribution and habitat
Saunders's gull breeds in eastern China and the west coast of Korea. It breeds in saltmarshes dominated by the seepweed (Suaeda glauca). It overwinters in southern China, Hong Kong, Macau, Taiwan, South Korea, southwestern Japan and Vietnam. Its winter habitats are estuaries and aquaculture ponds and some populations move inland to lakes and marshes.

Biology
Saunders's gull catches its prey by flying above the ground at about ten metres (yards) and dropping swiftly on any suitable prey it finds. In this way it catches mudskippers, crabs, fish and worms. It is also a kleptoparasite, stealing food items from other species of birds. It is a poor swimmer, having only partially webbed feet, and usually stays on land, moving up the beach in front of the rising tide.

It breeds in saltmarshes, its nest being a simple scrape in the ground. The birds are monogamous and each pair occupies a territory. Two or three eggs are laid in May and incubation takes about 22 days. Adults and young birds leave for their winter quarters in October.

Status
The total population of this gull is estimated as being 21,000 to 22,000 individuals and seems to be in decline. The IUCN has rated it as "vulnerable". The main threats it faces are the degradation of its habitat as it is very dependent on saltmarshes dominated by seepweed. In China, Taiwan, South Korea, Japan and elsewhere, saltmarshes are being drained to make way for aquaculture. The introduction of the strong-growing smooth cordgrass (Spartina alterniflora) has also had deleterious effects. The disturbance of adults also results in greater predation on the eggs and chicks.

References

External links

BirdLife Species Factsheet.

Saunders's gull
Birds of China
Birds of Korea
Birds of Manchuria
Saunders's gull
Taxonomy articles created by Polbot
Taxobox binomials not recognized by IUCN
Taxa named by Robert Swinhoe